Grand Duke Alexander Alexandrovich of Russia (Russian: Великий Князь Александр Александрович Романов; 7 June 1869 – 2 May 1870) was the infant son of then-Tsesarevich Alexander Alexandrovich and his wife, Tsesarevna Maria Feodorovna.

Grand Duke Alexander's father was heir apparent to the Russian throne as the eldest living son of Emperor Alexander II of Russia. The Grand Duke was Alexander and Marie's second child, second son, and the younger brother of the future Emperor Nicholas II. 

He died of bacterial meningitis in 1870, one month before his first birthday. Following his death, his mother wrote to her own mother, Queen Louise of Denmark: "The doctors maintain he did not suffer, but we suffered terribly to see and hear him." The only photo taken of the Grand Duke, was taken posthumously.

Sergei D. Sheremetev, the adjutant to Tsarevich Alexander, accompanied the body on horseback to the Peter and Paul Fortress. Alexander Alexandrovich was buried in the northern nave of the Peter and Paul Cathedral in a white marble sarcophagus.

Ancestry

References

1869 births
1870 deaths
Deaths from meningitis
Neurological disease deaths in Russia
Infectious disease deaths in Russia
House of Holstein-Gottorp-Romanov
Russian grand dukes
19th-century people from the Russian Empire
Children of Alexander III of Russia
Sons of emperors
Burials at Saints Peter and Paul Cathedral, Saint Petersburg

Royalty and nobility who died as children